Budki  is a village in the administrative district of Gmina Michów, within Lubartów County, Lublin Voivodeship, in eastern Poland.

The village has a population of 100.

References

Villages in Lubartów County